Wang Jun (born June 30, 1990) is a Paralympian athlete from China competing mainly in throwing events. She competes in the F35 classification.

She competed in the 2008 Summer Paralympics in Beijing, China. There she won a gold medal in the women's F42-46 discus throw event.

External links
 

1990 births
Paralympic athletes of China
Athletes (track and field) at the 2008 Summer Paralympics
Athletes (track and field) at the 2012 Summer Paralympics
Athletes (track and field) at the 2016 Summer Paralympics
Paralympic gold medalists for China
Paralympic silver medalists for China
Living people
Chinese female discus throwers
Medalists at the 2008 Summer Paralympics
Medalists at the 2012 Summer Paralympics
Medalists at the 2016 Summer Paralympics
Paralympic medalists in athletics (track and field)
Athletes (track and field) at the 2020 Summer Paralympics
Chinese female shot putters
21st-century Chinese women